Steel was an Italian entertainment TV channel, owned by NBCUniversal and broadcast on Premium Gallery, a Digital terrestrial television service in Italy. It started broadcasting on 19 January 2008 at 13:30 (CET Time).

It was aimed at a male audience and broadcast action and science fiction / fantasy TV series and movies, with a branded block called Syfy.

Steel was not available on Satellite television, and was not available outside Italy.

Programs

See also 
Mediaset Premium

External links
 Steel 
 Syfy on Steel 

Defunct television channels in Italy
Mediaset television channels
Television channels and stations established in 2008
Television channels and stations disestablished in 2013
2008 establishments in Italy
2013 disestablishments in Italy
Italian-language television stations